The New England Women's Lacrosse Alliance (NEWLA) was an NCAA Division III women's lacrosse-only conference that disbanded in 2012. NEWLA had nine member schools representing three states: (Maine, Massachusetts, and Vermont). The schools joined their primary sports conference, seven schools joined the Massachusetts State Collegiate Athletic Conference and two the New England Collegiate Conference.

Member schools
2012 season membership:
 Becker College
 Bridgewater State College
 Elms College
 Fitchburg State College
 Framingham State University
 Massachusetts Maritime
 Salem State
 Westfield State College
 Worcester State College

History
The NEWLA was founded in 1998. The original members consisted of two playing divisions: a North division consisting of Castleton State College, Colby-Sawyer College, Keene State College, New England College, University of New England, and Plymouth State College, and a South division consisting of Bridgewater State, Elms College, Endicott College, Eastern Connecticut State University, and UMass Dartmouth.

Past Champions
2004 - Western New England College
2005 - Western New England College
2006 - Western New England College
2007 - Western New England College
2008 - Bridgewater State
2009 - Bridgewater State
2010 - Bridgewater State
2011 - Bridgewater State
2012 - Bridgewater State

Former members
Colby Sawyer 1998-2002
Eastern Connecticut State 1998-2002
Emerson College 2004-2007
Endicott 1998-2002
Keene State 1998-2002
Lasell College 1999-2007
UMass Dartmouth 1998-2002
New England College 1998-2002
Norwich University 2007-2008
University of New England 1998-2002
Plymouth State 1998-2002
Salem State College 2002-2004
Salve Regina University 1999-2002
University of Southern Maine 1999-2002
Western New England College 1999-2007

References

External links
New England Women's Lacrosse Alliance website

College lacrosse leagues in the United States
NCAA Division III conferences